Canterbury is a constituency in Kent represented in the House of Commons of the UK Parliament since 2017 by Rosie Duffield of the Labour Party.

The seat dates to the earliest century of regular parliaments, in 1295; it elected two MPs until 1885, electing one thereafter, before being altered by the later-termed Fourth Reform Act in 1918 (the first being in 1832). Currently, the electorate (the total of people eligible to vote) is much greater than the average nationwide (the electoral quota); this is termed under-apportionment of representation.

Constituency profile
The seat takes in the cathedral and university city of Canterbury, rural villages to the south, and the seaside resort of Whitstable to the north. Full time students make up around a quarter of the electorate.

History
Constitutional status of seat
The widened Canterbury constituency was formed from an expansion of the narrow parliamentary borough (or simply borough) of the same name that existed from 1295 to 1918. This had elected two MPs from 1295 (the Model Parliament) until 1885, and then one until 1918.

Political history
Before the seat was reformed the politics of the town were greatly influenced by Canterbury Cathedral and the Archbishop of Canterbury.

From 1835 (where a Conservative was elected on petition) until 2017, the local electorate elected mostly candidates of the Conservative Party (with the exceptions of the elections of Independent Unionist Francis Bennett-Goldney, MP from 1910 to 1918, and of a few Whigs or Liberals when Canterbury had two seats); the seat was recognised in the Guinness Book of World Records as the longest uninterrupted period of one party holding a Parliamentary seat. The election of Labour's Rosie Duffield, who won the seat by just 187 votes in the 2017 election, marked the end of a 185-year period of Canterbury almost always electing Conservative-allied MPs, the longest recorded unbroken record of party representation in British political history. Her victory in this election was largely credited to the strategies of electoral strategist Jack Wilson, who at the time was the youngest senior political adviser in British history. She kept the seat, increasing her majority in 2019.

Size of electorate

Voters locally are under-apportioned a large fraction of a seat, and so, representative – population having risen, and homes having increased in a planned way, since the 2001 United Kingdom Census from which seats are predominantly drawn. This can be illustrated in that 27,182 was the number of votes cast for the runner-up in 2019 amid a locally high, three-quarters, turnout election.  Such voters for the runner-up were more than voted for the winner in 208 of the 535 English seats – and the second-highest such votes in the election, exceeded only in Stroud, by Labour's runner-up.  In the same election 12,713 votes won Kingston upon Hull East; 14,557 votes won Stoke-on-Trent Central; 6,531 votes won Na h-Eileanan an Iar; 11,705 won Caithness, Sutherland and Easter Ross; 12,959 won Ynys Môn and 15,149 won South Antrim.

Boundaries 

1918–1950: The County Borough of Canterbury, the Urban Districts of Herne Bay and Whitstable, the Rural Districts of Bridge and Elham, and the Rural District of Blean with the detached parts of the parishes of Dunkirk and Hernhill which were wholly surrounded by the rural district.

1950–1983: The County Borough of Canterbury, the Urban Districts of Herne Bay and Whitstable, and the Rural District of Bridge Blean.

1983–1997: The City of Canterbury wards of Barham Downs, Barton, Blean Forest, Chartham, Chestfield, Gorrell, Harbledown, Harbour, Little Stour, Marshside, Northgate, North Nailbourne, St Stephen's, Seasalter, Stone Street, Sturry North, Sturry South, Swalecliffe, Tankerton, Westgate, and Wincheap, and the Borough of Swale wards of Boughton and Courtenay.

1997–2010: as 1983 less the two Borough of Swale wards.

2010–present: The City of Canterbury wards of Barham Downs, Barton, Blean Forest, Chartham and Stone Street, Chestfield and Swalecliffe, Gorrell, Harbledown, Harbour, Little Stour, North Nailbourne, Northgate, St Stephen's, Seasalter, Sturry North, Sturry South, Tankerton, Westgate, and Wincheap.

Members of Parliament

Parliamentary borough of Canterbury

MPs 1295–1660

MPs 1660–1880

MPs 1885–1918 
Constituency representation restored and reduced to one (1885)

Canterbury county constituency

MPs 1918–present

Elections

Elections in the 2010s

Elections in the 2000s

Elections in the 1990s

Elections in the 1980s

Elections in the 1970s

Elections in the 1960s

Elections in the 1950s

Elections in the 1940s

Elections in the 1930s

Elections in the 1920s

Elections in the 1910s

General Election 1914/15:

Another General Election was required to take place before the end of 1915. The political parties had been making preparations for an election to take place and by July 1914, the following candidates had been selected; 
Unionist: Francis Bennett-Goldney
Liberal: D. Roland Thomas

Elections in the 1900s

Elections in the 1890s

Elections in the 1880s

 
 

After findings of corruption, the writ for Canterbury was suspended and the election result voided. The constituency was reconstituted in 1885.

Elections in the 1870s

 
 

Butler-Johnstone resigned, causing a by-election.

Majendie resigned, causing a by-election.

Elections in the 1860s
Johnstone resigned, causing a by-election.

Elections in the 1850s
Denison was elevated to the peerage, becoming 1st Baron Londesborough, and causing a by-election.

 
  

 

 Smythe retired before polling. The election was declared void on petition, due to bribery, and the writ suspended on 21 February 1853. A by-election was called to replace both MPs in August 1854.

Elections in the 1840s

 
  

 

 Caused by Bradshaw's death

 
  
 

 
  
 

 Caused by Denison's resignation

Elections in the 1830s

 
 

 

 

 

 
 
 
 

 On petition, Villiers was declared unduly elected and Lushington declared elected.

See also
List of parliamentary constituencies in Kent

Notes

References

Sources

External links 
nomis Constituency Profile for Canterbury — presenting data from the ONS annual population survey and other official statistics.

 
Parliamentary constituencies in Kent
Constituencies of the Parliament of the United Kingdom established in 1295